Steven Rasmussen is an American psychiatrist, currently the Mary E. Zucker Professor of Psychiatry and Human Behavior at Brown University, and is a major figure in his field. He is a member of the Society for Neuroscience and American Psychological Association.

References

Year of birth missing (living people)
Place of birth missing (living people)
Living people
Brown University faculty
American psychiatrists
Brown University alumni